Beth Shemesh (House of the Sun) is the name of three places in the Land of Israel and one location in Ancient Egypt mentioned in the Hebrew Bible:

a city in southwest Judah, remains excavated next to modern Beit Shemesh
a city in northern Israel allocated to the Tribe of Naphtali
a city allocated to the tribe of Issachar – possibly `Ain esh-Shemsîyeh
On-Heliopolis, in Egypt, mentioned in Jeremiah 43:13

References

Hebrew Bible cities